Johann Rahn (Latinised form Rhonius) (10 March 1622 – 25 May 1676) was a Swiss mathematician who is credited with the first use of the division sign, ÷ (a repurposed obelus variant) and the therefore sign, ∴. The symbols were used in Teutsche Algebra, published in 1659. John Pell collaborated with Rahn in this book, which contains an example of the Pell equation. It is uncertain whether Rahn or Pell was responsible for introducing the symbols.

Books
 Teutsche Algebra - Johann H. Rahn

Literature
R. Acampora Johann Heinrich Rahn und seine Teutsche Algebra, in R. Gebhardt (Herausgeber) Visier- und Rechenbücher der frühen Neuzeit, Schriften des Adam-Ries-Bundes Annaberg-Buchholz 19, 2008, S. 163–178
 Moritz Cantor:  Rahn, Johann Heinrich . In: General German Biography (ADB). Volume 27, Duncker & Humblot, Leipzig, 1888, pp. 174 f
Noel Malcolm, Jacqueline Stedall John Pell (1611–1685) and His Correspondence with Sir Charles Cavendish: The Mental World of an Early Modern Mathematician, Oxford University Press, Oxford, 2005
Christoph Scriba John Pell's English Edition of J. H. Rahn 's Teutsche Algebra, in: R. S. Cohen (Herausgeber) For Dirk Struik, Reidel: Dordrecht 1974, S. 261–274
Jacqueline Stedall A Discourse Concerning Algebra: English Algebra to 1685, Oxford University Press, Oxford, 2002

See also
 History of mathematical notation

References
general
 Cajori, Florian. A History of Mathematical Notations. 2 volumes. Lasalle, Illinois: The Open Court Publishing Co., 1928–1929 vol. 2, page 211.
citations

1622 births
1676 deaths
17th-century Swiss mathematicians